Subedar Chain Singh (born 5 April 1989) is an Indian sport shooter and a Junior Commissioned Officer (JCO) in the Indian Army. He won the Bronze medal at the 2014 Asian Games in the men's 50m rifle 3 positions event. He won an individual Gold medal in the 7th Asian Airgun championship Kuwait. He won six Gold medals, three in individual events and three in team events, in the 2016 South Asian Games.

Career 
Chain Singh learned to shoot in the Indian Army in 2007.

2014 Asian Games 
Chain Singh was a Bronze medalist in the 2014 Asian Games at Incheon in South Korea. He won a Bronze medal in the men's 50m rifle three positions event, scoring 441.7 points to finish behind two Chinese shooters - Cao Yifei and Zhu Qinan - who scored 455.5 and 455.2 points respectively.

2014 7th Asian Airgun championship  
Singh won an individual Gold medal in the 7th Asian Airgun Championship which was held in Kuwait from  7 March to 15 March. His final score was 206 points. followed by Qin Cong and Liu Zhiguo of China.

2015 National Games 
The 2015 National Games of India was held from 31 January to 14 February across seven districts of Kerala, India.[1] It was the second time that Kerala had hosted the national games. Singh won 3 individual  medals (2 Gold and 1 Bronze) followed by 3 team Gold medals in all 3 Rifle shooting events. He set a national record in the 50-metre 3-position event by earning 1181/1200 points, which was also his personal best. He participated in two events in the International Shooting Competition at Hannover, Germany during April 2015.  In the FR Prone he won Gold and in Air Rifle Silver.

2016 South Asian games 
Singh bagged six Gold medals in the 12th South Asian Games held at Guwahati in India in 2016. He won all his events and secured his spot for the Rio Olympics.

2016 Rio Olympics 
Singh has represented the country in Rio Olympic Games in rifle shooting (50 m 3-position event) which was held in Brazil, where he placed 23rd.

Indian National Shooting Championship
Singh won more than 50 medals in National Shooting Championships.

XXI Commonwealth Games Australia 
Singh represented India at XXI Commonwealth Games in shooting sport, held at Gold Coast Australia from 4 April to 15 April 2018, where he placed 4th in 50 m rifle prone men event and 5th in 50 m rifle 3 position event.

ISSF World Cup, Munich 
Chain Singh won silver medal at ISSF world cup (Grand Prix) Munich in Germany 2018  with a score of 627.9 points in the 50-meter rifle prone event.

References

External links
 Profile at incheon2014.kr

Living people
1989 births
Indian Army personnel
Indian male sport shooters
Shooters at the 2014 Asian Games
People from Doda district
Sport shooters from Jammu and Kashmir
Asian Games medalists in shooting
Shooters at the 2016 Summer Olympics
Olympic shooters of India
Asian Games bronze medalists for India
Medalists at the 2014 Asian Games
South Asian Games gold medalists for India
South Asian Games medalists in shooting